The 2022 Women's European Baseball Championship was an international baseball tournament for women organized by Confederation of European Baseball. The 2022 European Championship was held in August 2022 in Montpellier, France. France were defending champions and hosts for the second successive tournament. It was Great Britain's first international championship.

Teams 
The following four teams qualified for the 2022 championship.

Group stage

Final

Final Standings

References

External links
Official site

European Baseball Championship
2020s in women's baseball
2022 in baseball
International sports competitions hosted by France
Women's baseball competitions